In Greek mythology, Pericastor (Ancient Greek: Περικάστωρ) was the father of Androthoe who married Peristhenes and became the mother of the fisherman Dictys and Polydectes, king of Seriphos. Otherwise, nothing is known about him.

Note 

Characters in Greek mythology